Francis or Frank Cook may refer to:
Francis Cook, 1st Viscount of Monserrate (1817–1901), British textile trader
Sir Francis Cook, 4th Baronet (1907–1978), British artist
Frank Cook (American football) (fl. 1892), American football coach
Frank Cook (American musician) (1942–2021), American drummer for the blues rock band Canned Heat
Frank Cook (Australian footballer) (1916–1973), Australian rules footballer
Frank Cook (Norwegian musician), Norwegian jazz musician and band leader
Frank Cook (politician) (1935–2012), British politician
Frank Cook (surgeon) (1888–1972), obstetric and gynaecological surgeon
Francis A. Cook (1843–1916), U.S. States Navy officer
Frank C. Cook IV (1963–2009), American ethnobotanist, humanitarian and educator

See also 
Francis Cooke (disambiguation)
Frank Cooke (disambiguation)
Frances Crook, chief executive of the Howard League for Penal Reform
Cook (surname)